The A5 is a Swiss autobahn (motorway) connecting Luterbach, Solothurn, Biel/Bienne, La Neuveville, Neuchâtel, and Yverdon. It branches off to the northeast before Solothurn from the Swiss motorway A1, passes through Biel and Neuchâtel to Yverdon-les-Bains in the southwest, where it rejoins the A1.

Road
The A5 Swiss motorway is approximately 100 km long. It leads along the southeastern side of the Jura Mountains in an arc from southwest to northeast.

References

A05